The Women's pursuit event of the Biathlon World Championships 2015 was held on 8 March 2015. The fastest 60 athletes of the sprint competition participated over a course of 10 km.

Results
The race was started at 17:00 EET.

References

Women's pursuit
2015 in Finnish women's sport